Butler Township is the name of some places in the U.S. state of Pennsylvania:
Butler Township, Adams County, Pennsylvania
Butler Township, Butler County, Pennsylvania
Butler Township, Luzerne County, Pennsylvania
Butler Township, Schuylkill County, Pennsylvania

Pennsylvania township disambiguation pages